Barbouriidae is a family of shrimp, comprising three genera:
Barbouria Rathbun, 1912
Janicea Manning & Hart, 1984
Parhippolyte Borradaile, 1900

See also
Parhippolyte sterreri

References

Alpheoidea
Decapod families